The Fluchthorn or Piz Fenga is a mountain in the Silvretta Alps, located on the border between Austria and Switzerland. The Fluchthorn lies between the Jamtal (Tyrol) and the Val Fenga (Graubünden). It consists of three summits of which the southern one is the highest.

See also
 List of most isolated mountains of Switzerland
 List of mountains of Graubünden

References

External links
 Fluchthorn on Hikr

Mountains of Graubünden
Mountains of Tyrol (state)
Mountains of the Alps
Alpine three-thousanders
Austria–Switzerland border
International mountains of Europe
Mountains of Switzerland
Silvretta Alps
Valsot